Mark James Elgar Coode (born 1937) is a British botanist, taxonomic author and authority in the field of Elaeocarpaceae.

Graduated in 1961 at the University of Cambridge, he moved to the University of Edinburgh, starting to work as an assistant to Peter Hadland Davis on the Flora of Turkey project, funded by the Science Research Council and based at the Royal Botanic Garden, Edinburgh; in recent years, together with James Cullen, who worked on the same project, he was the taxonomic author of some plants (for example Abies nordmanniana subsp. equi-trojani). In 1966 he was appointed senior botanist in the Botanical Division of the Forest Department of Lae, Papua Niugini, a role that allowed him to collect and study several plant species of the mainland of PNG and of New Ireland, writing a forest manual on Combretaceae and working on the Melanesian Terminalia. In 1972 he was the first taxonomist assigned to work on the Flore des Mascareignes project at Kew. In 1975 he was appointed chief scientific director of the herbarium at the Royal Botanic Gardens, Kew, a position he held until 1998, also becoming director of the Kew Bulletin from 1977 to 1990. He now lives near Monmouth, on the border with Wales.

In addition to Papua New Guinea, he participated in botanical scientific expeditions to the Congo (1959) and Turkey (1962, 1965).

Main works

1972. Notes on the Flora of Two Papuan Mountains. Papua and New Guinea Scientific Soc. Proc. 23. With Peter Francis Stevens. 8 pp.
1976. Notes on Pittosporaceae and Myrsinaceae of the Mascarenes. Kew Bulletin 31: 221–225.
1979. Further notes on Myrsinaceae in the Mascarene Islands. Kew Bulletin 34: 413–416. 
1981. Myrsinacées. In: Bosser J, Cadet T, Guého J, Marais W, eds. Flore des Mascareignes. Kew: MSIRI, ORSTROM & RBG, 115, 1–25.
1996. A checklist of the flowering plants & gymnosperms of Brunci Darassalam. And the. de Ministry of Industry & Primary Res. 477 pp.
1965. Flora of Turkey and the East Aegean Islands ... With J. Cullen, Peter Hadland Davis. Ed. Univ. Press, 567 pp.

References

External links
 Works by Mark James Elgar Coode, on Open Library

1937 births
Living people
Botanists active in Kew Gardens
People from Monmouth, Wales
20th-century British botanists
20th-century British people
British taxonomists
Alumni of the University of Cambridge